RMT v Serco Ltd and ASLEF v London & Birmingham Railway [2011] EWCA Civ 226 is a joined UK labour law case, concerning the right to strike under the Trade Union and Labour Relations (Consolidation) Act 1992.

Facts
An injunction was granted against ASLEF after the union included two members in a ballot who were not entitled to vote, 605 people altogether. In the ballot, 472 voted, and 410 were in favour of taking collective action. The employer argued that this violated TULRCA 1992 section 226A, which requires accuracy in who should vote. It also argued that the union did not provide accurate information in the notice of its intention to hold a strike ballot.

The High Court held that the notice of the ballot was inaccurate because two extra members were included.

Judgment
Elias LJ held that the inclusion of the extra members was a trivial mistake, and excusable. It was necessary to read all the words of the statute, especially TULRCA 1992 section 226A, so that the union was required only to provide information ‘so far as reasonably practicable is accurate at the time it is given having regard to the information in the union’s possession’.

Elias LJ gave the leading judgment, with the following introductory obiter dictum.

Etherton LJ and Mummery LJ concurred.

See also

UK labour law

Notes

References
R Dukes, ‘The Right to Strike under UK Law: Something More than a Slogan?’ (2011) 40 ILJ 302

United Kingdom labour case law